Indie Source is a clothing manufacturer based in Los Angeles, California that provides development and manufacturing services to fashion designers and entrepreneurs. The company was founded in 2012 by Zack Hurley and Jesse Dombrowiak and has 20 employees.

History

Indie Source was featured in episode 8 of 2016 BET series Music Moguls. Damon Dash visits Indie Source to work on his clothing line, Poppington Clothing. 

Hurley and Dombrowiak were featured in Forbes 30 Under 30 in Manufacturing in 2018.

Hurley and Dombrowiak were featured in Apparel Magazine's Top Under-30 Elite in 2018.

Corporate Culture

Made-in-USA

Indie Source is an advocate for Made-in-USA manufacturing. In 2017, after the closing of American Apparel and dismissal of 2,400 employees, Hurley was quoted by the Los Angeles Times that there "needs to be a call to action. We can definitely take strides in hiring dozens, but to get to thousands there has to be an actual shift in thinking."

References

External links
Official website

Clothing manufacturers
Manufacturing companies based in Los Angeles
Manufacturing companies established in 2012